The Gubrist Tunnel is a motorway tunnel in Switzerland. The tunnel lies to the north-west of the city of Zürich, and forms part of the A1 motorway, on its northern ring section around Zürich.

The tunnel is named after the hill of Gubrist, which is nearby.  In 1990 63,000 cars/day used this tunnel; in 2014 the number had risen to 106,000, but by 2025 this number is expected to rise to 125,000.

On 12 September 2007 the Swiss government voted for the widening of the tunnel. A third parallel tube will raise the number of the lanes from 4 to 7 (2 + 2 in direction St Gallen and 3 towards Bern). 890 Million Swiss francs will be committed for the construction of the 3.2 km long tunnel.

This is part of the 'A1 Nordumfahrung' renovation plan covering the western entrance, the Gubrist tunnel itself, and a further 10 km of motorway west of the tunnel.  The project will expand the motorway approaching the tunnel from its original 4 lanes (2 in each direction) to 6 lanes (3 in each direction).  The major junctions immediately east (the Weiningen junction) and west (the Affoltern junction) of the tunnel will also be modernised. The project will cost in total 1.55 billion Swiss francs.  Work started in 2014 and is scheduled to take 9 years.

In 2012, the Gubrist Tunnel was rated as 'sufficient' in a test of tunnel safety undertaken by the Touring Club Suisse and was the second worst tunnel in the test.

References 

Road tunnels in Switzerland
Buildings and structures in the canton of Zürich
Motorways in Switzerland
Transport in the canton of Zürich